Denise Rodrigues Fraga (born 15 October 1964) is a Brazilian actress. She is also a columnist at Editora Globo's  Crescer magazine.

Filmography 
Bambolê (1987) – Amália
A, E, I, O, Urca (1990)
Barriga de Aluguel (1990) – Ritinha
Éramos Seis (1994) – Olga
Sangue do Meu Sangue (1995) – Natália
Cousin Bazilio (1998) – Natália
Por Trás do Pano (1999) – Helena
O Auto da Compadecida (2000) – Dora
Uga-Uga (2000) – Meg
Cristina Quer Casar (2003) – Cristina
The Sign of the City (2007) – Lydia
Norma (2009) – Norma
O Contador Histórias (2009)
As Melhores Coisas do Mundo (2010) – Camila
Hoje (2011) – Vera
A Lei do Amor (2016) – Cândida Martins
Kissing Game (2020)

References

External links 

 

1965 births
Living people
Brazilian film actresses
Brazilian telenovela actresses
Brazilian columnists
Actresses from Rio de Janeiro (city)
20th-century Brazilian actresses
21st-century Brazilian actresses
Brazilian women columnists